Jedediah Spenser Purdy (born 29 November 1974 in Chloe, West Virginia) is an American legal scholar and cultural commentator. In 2022 he became the 
Raphael Lemkin Professor of Law at Duke University School of Law, where he teaches courses on Property and Past and Future of Capitalist Democracy. From 2018 to 2022 he was William S. Beinecke Professor of Law at Columbia Law School, teaching courses on American Constitutional Law, Constitutional Law and Democracy and its Crisis. He previously taught at Duke University School of Law from 2004 to 2018. 

Purdy is the author of two widely discussed books: For Common Things: Irony, Trust, and Commitment in America Today (1999) and Being America: Liberty, Commerce and Violence in an American World (2003). He is also the author of Two Cheers for Politics: Why Democracy Is Flawed, Frightening ― and Our Best Hope (2022), This Land Is Our Land: The Struggle for a New Commonwealth (2019), After Nature: A Politics for the Anthropocene (2015), The Meaning of Property: Freedom, Community and the Legal Imagination  (2010), and A Tolerable Anarchy: Rebels, Reactionaries, and the Making of American Freedom (2009).

Early life and education
Purdy, the son of Wally and Deirdre Purdy, was homeschooled in West Virginia until age 13, high school. He graduated from Phillips Exeter Academy and  Harvard College, where he was inducted into Phi Beta Kappa as a junior in 1996 and became a Truman Scholar in 1997. He graduated from Yale Law School in its Class of 2001. From 2001 to 2002, he was a fellow at the New America Foundation, a think tank that has been described as radical centrist in orientation.

Career
After law school, Purdy clerked for Pierre N. Leval of the United States Court of Appeals for the Second Circuit, in New York in 2002-2003. From 2004 to 2019, Purdy was a professor of law at Duke University teaching constitutional, environmental, and property law.

He also served on the editorial advisory board of the Ethics & International Affairs. 
Purdy joined the faculty of Columbia Law School in July 2019.

Works
For Common Things: Irony, Trust, and Commitment in America Today, Knopf (1999)
Being America: Liberty, Commerce and Violence in an American World, Vintage (2003)
A Tolerable Anarchy: Rebels, Reactionaries, and the Making of American Freedom, Knopf (2009)
The Meaning of Property: Freedom, Community and the Legal Imagination, Yale University Press (2010)
After Nature: A Politics for the Anthropocene, Harvard University Press (2015)
This Land Is Our Land: The Struggle for a New Commonwealth, Princeton University Press (October 15, 2019)

Notes

See also
Anthropocene

External links
Columbia Law School faculty profile
Sella, Profile: "Against Irony", New York Times Magazine, 5 September 1999
Liberal Empire: Assessing the Arguments by Jedediah Purdy, Ethics & International Affairs, Volume 17.2 Carnegie Council, September 16, 2003
Washington Post profile, "A Super-Scholar, All Grown Up and Still Theorizing", April 10, 2006.
Todd Pruzan, "Jedediah in Love", McSweeney's, 12 October 1999

American legal scholars
21st-century American non-fiction writers
American political writers
Radical centrist writers
Duke University School of Law faculty
Phillips Exeter Academy alumni
Harvard College alumni
Yale University alumni
People from Calhoun County, West Virginia
1974 births
Living people
Columbia Law School faculty